Synchiropus rosulentus, the rosy dragonet, is a species of fish in the family Callionymidae, the dragonets. It is found in the Eastern Central Pacific Ocean.

References

rosulentus
Fish of the Pacific Ocean
Taxa named by John Ernest Randall
Fish described in 1999